This is a  list of shipwrecks in 1757. It includes ships sunk, wrecked or otherwise lost during 1757.

January

12 January

14 January

21 January

25 January

Unknown date

February

6 February

8 February

10 February

Unknown date

March

13 March

16 March

23 March

24 March

27 March

28 March

Unknown date

April

22 April

Unknown date

May

14 May

Unknown date

June

10 June

Unknown date

July

2 July

27 July

Unknown date

August

12 August

Unknown date

September

9 September

11 September

16 September

21 September

22 September

24 September

26 September

Unknown date

October

3 October

10 October

17 October

18 October

25 October

28 October

Unknown date

November

3 November

6 November

8 November

11 November

29 November

30 November

Unknown date

December

3 December

4 December

19 December

20 December

24 December

Unknown date

Unknown date

References

1757